Canot may refer to:

Places

Canada
 Bras des Canots, a tributary of the Valin River, in Saguenay–Lac-Saint-Jean, Quebec
 Pointe-Canot, a village of Quebec
 Baie du Canot Rouge, a bay of Taureau Reservoir, in Lanaudière, Quebec
 Rivière aux Canots (Métabetchouane River), a tributary of the Métabetchouane River, in Lac-Saint-Jean, Quebec
 Rivière aux Canots (rivière aux Écorces), a tributary of the Rivière aux Écorces, in La Côte-de-Beaupré and Lac-Saint-Jean-Est, Quebec
 Rivière aux Canots Est, a tributary of the rivière aux Canots, in Lac-Achouakan and Lac-Moncouche, Quebec
 Rivière du Canot,  a tributary of the Gatineau River in Laurentides, Quebec
 Chemin des Canots River, a tributary of the Malbaie River, Capitale-Nationale, Quebec

Haiti
 Rivière Canot, a tributary of the Artibonite River

People with the surname 
 Pierre-Charles Canot (1710–1777), French engraver based in London.
 Théodore Canot (1804–1860), slave trader and writer

See also
 
 Canoe